Qudus Lawal (born 4 September 1995) is a Nigerian footballer who plays as a forward for the Milwaukee Wave in the Major Arena Soccer League.

Career
Came to America from Nigeria in 2011 and in his first year in Chicago he led Mather high school to the class 2A championship which was the first state championship for a Chicago public school soccer team in 37 years. That was his first year of high school in America and also his senior year.

Professional
On 18 March 2015, Lawal signed a professional contract with Seattle Sounders FC 2 after a successful preseason trial with the club.  He made his professional debut on 29 March in a 4–0 victory over Whitecaps FC 2.  On 16 April, he made his first start for S2 and netted a brace against Tulsa Roughnecks FC.  Unfortunately, the match ended in a 4–3 defeat.

On 15 June 2015, Lawal was traded to Wilmington Hammerheads in exchange for Ashani Fairclough.

In November 2018, Lawal went on trial with Fresno FC and later signed with the club on 23 January 2019.

Following the dissolution of Fresno FC, Lawal signed with the St. Louis Ambush of the Major Arena Soccer League.

References

External links

1995 births
Living people
Nigerian footballers
Nigerian expatriate footballers
Tacoma Defiance players
Wilmington Hammerheads FC players
Association football forwards
Expatriate soccer players in the United States
USL Championship players
United Premier Soccer League players
Chicago FC United players
USL League Two players
Soccer players from Chicago
Fresno FC players
Mather High School alumni
San Diego Loyal SC players
St. Louis Ambush (2013–) players
Major Arena Soccer League players
Expatriate footballers in Albania
Expatriate footballers in Egypt
Haras El Hodoud SC players
Milwaukee Wave players